The Union Nationale des Experts Traducteurs Interprètes près les Cours d'Appel is a member organization of the International Federation of Translators.

Experts-traducteurs are professional translators chosen by a jury on application to the Cour d'Appel (Appellate Court) of their home region in France. They have to show the jury, on request, that they have been working for a minimum of three years and that the result of their work corresponds exactly to the original text. They are then listed on a document tended by the regional Cour d'Appel as a regional expert translator/interpreter. They are regularly checked by police officers on their personal acquaintances and life style to ensure loyalty, lawfulness and impartiality. Translators listed at the Cour d'Appel can, after another three years, file a new application at the jury of the Cour de Cassation in Paris to be listed as a national expert translator.

External links
 UNETICA website

Translation associations
 
Language interpretation